This was the first edition of the tournament since 2009.

Marcus Daniell and Artem Sitak won the title, defeating Santiago González and Mate Pavić 3–6, 6–2, [12–10] in the final.

Seeds

Draw

References
 Main Draw

Abierto de Puebla - Doubles
Challenger Britania Zavaleta
Mex